Direct experience or immediate experience generally denotes experience gained through immediate sense perception.  Many philosophical systems hold that knowledge or skills gained through direct experience cannot be fully put into words.

See also
 Abhijñā
 Firsthand learning

References
 

Perception
Concepts in epistemology